José Manuel Rojas Bahamondes (born 23 June 1983), known as José Rojas, is a Chilean former footballer who played as a defender. Primarily a central defender, he could also be deployed as a left-back.

Club career
Rojas has played the whole of his career for Universidad de Chile except a brief stint with Argentine side Independiente in 2006. He has won four league championships with Universidad de Chile, in Apertura 2004, Apertura 2009 and Apertura and Clausura 2011. For the 2011 season he was selected by his teammates as captain, after Miguel Pinto left the club. In 2011, he captained Universidad de Chile to its first international title as they won the 2011 edition of the Copa Sudamericana in Santiago.

In 13 February 2023, he announced his retirement after twenty years as a professional footballer.

International career
He made his debut with Chile national team on 9 May 2007, in a friendly against Cuba scoring a goal in the game.

International goals

Honours

Club
Universidad de Chile
 Primera División de Chile (6): 2004–A, 2009–A, 2011–A, 2011–C, 2012–A, 2014–A 1
 Copa Sudamericana: 2011
 Copa Chile (2): 2012–13, 2015
 Supercopa de Chile: 2015

(1): “A” and “C” refer the Apertura and Clausura tournaments that divide the Chilean football champions.

International
Chile
Copa América: 2015

Notes

References

External links
 
 
 Primera División Argentina statistics at Futbol XXI  
 

1983 births
Living people
People from Santiago Metropolitan Region
Chilean footballers
Chilean expatriate footballers
Chile international footballers
Universidad de Chile footballers
Club Atlético Independiente footballers
Club Atlético Belgrano footballers
Lorca FC players
San Luis de Quillota footballers
C.D. Huachipato footballers
Curicó Unido footballers
Chilean Primera División players
Argentine Primera División players
Segunda División B players
Chilean expatriate sportspeople in Argentina
Chilean expatriate sportspeople in Spain
Expatriate footballers in Argentina
Expatriate footballers in Spain
2014 FIFA World Cup players
2015 Copa América players
Copa América-winning players
Association football defenders